Nyctimystes papua, the Papua big-eyed tree frog,  is a species of frog in the subfamily Pelodryadinae, endemic to Papua New Guinea. Its natural habitats are subtropical or tropical moist montane forests and rivers.

References

papua
Amphibians of Papua New Guinea
Amphibians described in 1897
Taxonomy articles created by Polbot